Hi-Fi Serious is the third studio album by British alternative rock band A, released in 2002.

The name "Hi-Fi Serious" was derived from the name of the hi-fi electronics store Alan Partridge buys a Bang & Olufsen stereo from in the last episode of I'm Alan Partridge series 1. The tour in support of this album's release was called the 'Inner City Sumo' tour - another reference to I'm Alan Partridge (Season 1 Episode 1).

Charts, sales and legacy
The album is certified Silver in the U.K., having sold over 60,000 copies.

First single, "Nothing", made it to  9 in the UK singles chart before the album's release, propelling the band higher up the ladder - the album peaked at No. 18 in the UK album charts - and although they were still not seen as a mainstream artist, the album still won them "Best British Band" at the Kerrang! Awards.

In 2005, readers of Kerrang! magazine voted Hi-Fi Serious the 57th best British rock album ever.

Track listing
 "Nothing" – 3:43
 "Something's Going On" – 2:58
 "6 o'Clock on a Tube Stop" – 3:14
 "Going Down" – 4:09
 "Took It Away" – 3:29
 "Starbucks" – 3:18
 "The Springs" – 4:28
 "Shut Yer Face" – 3:43
 "Pacific Ocean Blue" – 3:27
 "The Distance" – 3:37
 "W.D.Y.C.A.I." (Why Don't You Cry About It) – 3:27
 "Hi-Fi Serious" – 5:57
 "Champions of Endings" (U.S.  bonus track) - 4:25

B-Sides
 "Asshole" - 4:45
 "T-Shirt Money" – 3:27
 "Everybody In" – 4:16
 "Getting Me Off" - 3:10
 "Some People" - 2:05
 "Monterey" - 2:52
 "Coming Around" - 3:31
 "Rock" - 4:05
 "Human Condition" - 4:03
 "Sorry But..."
 "Just Like Paradise"

DVD features
Hi-Fi Serious was later re-released with an additional DVD of live footage and other video clips of the band.
This included music videos for "Nothing", "The Distance" & "Old Folks" (From Monkey Kong), a 12-minute documentary, UK TV commercials for Hi-Fi Serious, and 20 minutes of "Live at Reading 2002" footage.

References

External links
Lyrics

A (band) albums
2002 albums